Matthias Feys (born 22 May 1985 in Bruges) is a Belgian retired footballer. He usually played as defensive midfielder.

Career
Like Frederik Boi, Bram Vandenbussche and Jan Masureel, Feys was a typical youth product of Cercle Brugge: he never played for any other team before achieving a place in the senior squad. Though on 30 June 2007, his contract expired and wasn't renewed. He was signed in the beginning of July 2007 by RC Waregem.

References

 Matthias Feys player info at the official Cercle Brugge site

External links
 Matthias Feys at Footballdatabase

Living people
1985 births
Footballers from Bruges
Belgian footballers
Cercle Brugge K.S.V. players
K.V. Woluwe-Zaventem players
K.M.S.K. Deinze players
Association football midfielders
Belgian Pro League players
Royal FC Mandel United players